Chhena jhili is a popular dessert from cuisine of Odisha, India. Its birthplace is Nimapada in Puri district. It is prepared in fried cheese and sugar syrup.

The man who started preparing this sweet was Aarta Sahoo from the Shyam Sundarpur Village of Nimapara.

Sample ingredients
 Indian cottage cheese – 400 grams
 Sugar – 2 cup
 Wheat flour – 2 tsp
 Cardamom powder – ½ tsp
 Pure Ghee-500 ml
These are the generally known ingredients.
The actual recipe is a family secret and is being maintained by the successors of the late Aarta Sahoo.

References

Indian desserts
Odia cuisine
Puri district
Cheese dishes